The Curtiss GS aircraft were two types of similar scout aircraft designed and built by the Curtiss Aeroplane and Motor Company for the United States Navy.

Design and development
In 1917 the United States Navy ordered five scout aircraft from Curtiss, they were designated the GS for Gnome Scout, named for the French-built  Gnome rotary engine used to power the aircraft. The GS was a biplane with a central float and a stabiliser float at each end of the lower wing. The Navy ordered an additional aircraft as a triplane, which was designated the GS-1 and the original aircraft was retrospectively designated the GS-2. Although they were delivered to the Navy in 1918 nothing further is known about the type, other than that the GS-1 was destroyed in a landing accident on 1 April 1918.

Variants
GS-1
Triplane scout floatplane, one built.
GS-2
Biplane scout floatplane, five built.

Operators

United States Navy

See also

References

Citations

Bibliography

 

GS
1910s United States military reconnaissance aircraft
Floatplanes
Triplanes
Single-engined tractor aircraft
Biplanes
Rotary-engined aircraft
Aircraft first flown in 1918